Maharashtra Udayagiri Institute of Management and Technology Somnathpur is an engineering college based in Udgir, India. It was founded in 2009 and is a part of the Maharashtra Udaygiri Education Society's group of educational institutions.

It is a technical institute affiliated to Nanded University and managed by the Maharashtra Udaygiri Education Society (MUES). It is located at Somnathpur, Udgir in Latur District.

Admissions
Students are admitted on the basis of marks scored on the Maharashtra Engineering Entrance Test (CET) or on the basis of marks scored in Physics, Chemistry and Maths combined in the Std. XII examinations. Students from outside Maharashtra are admitted through the All-India Engineering Entrance Exam (AIEEE). A percentage of students are admitted under the management quota, involving a higher fee-structure and capitation fees. See college website for admission details : https://web.archive.org/web/20100515085008/http://www.muimt.ac.in/

Courses offered

Undergraduate
 Computer Science and Engineering (60 seats)
 Mechanical Engineering (60 seats)
 Electronics and Telecommunication Engineering (60 seats)
 Electrical Engineering (60 seats)

Placements
The training and placement cell on the campus is in charge of preparing students in the third (and sometimes fourth) year to appear for campus interviews.

Location
The location is 5 km away from the bus-stand in Udgir. The college is located on a hill, and hence enjoys a beautiful environment and pleasant weather.

Sister institutes
Maharashtra Udayagiri Institute of Management and Technology Somnathpur has other colleges at the same campus (Maharashtra Udayagiri College Udgir).

References

Engineering colleges in Maharashtra
Education in Latur
Engineering colleges in Latur
Educational institutions established in 2009
2009 establishments in Maharashtra